Peter Ujal Hagverdiyev (9 June 1960 — 18 December 2004) was an Azerbaijani painter, member of the Union of Artists of Azerbaijan.

Biography
Ujal Hagverdiyev was born on June 9, 1960 in Baku. He studied at Art School named after Azim Azimzade. In 1979 he was admitted to the State Art Institute of the Estonian SSR, but continued his education at Azerbaijan State Pedagogical University named after Vladimir Lenin (now named after N.Tusi).

In 1985 Hagverdiyev joined the Young Artists Union under the Union of Artists. Since 1997, he became a member of the Union of Artists of Azerbaijan.

In 1987 U.Hagverdiyev started participating in exhibitions in the Soviet Union and Azerbaijan. The same year, he became an Orthodox Christian, got baptized and took the name "Peter". In 1988–1991, he was a pensioner of the USSR Academy of Arts and participated in the Academy's reporting exhibitions.

In 1990 Ujal Hagverdiyev participated in an exhibition of young Azerbaijani artists in France and in 1995 in a joint exhibition of Azerbaijani and Turkish artists in Istanbul. Also his personal exhibitions were held in Tunisia (in Tunis - 1991), in Germany (in Cologne - 1992), in Austria (in Vienna - 1993). The artist also participated in symposiums in Austria, Germany and Baku. In 1998–1999, he participated at "Land ART" project with a number of artists, and in 2000 was awarded the Humay Award as a part of the "Labyrinth" group. From 2000 to 2004, he volunteered for the artistic design of the Michael Archangel Church in Baku. Ujal Hagverdiyev's works have been demonstrated in the United States, Germany, Austria, France, Norway and Turkey.

Peter Ujal Hagverdiyev died on December 18, 2004 in Baku.

Family
Son of Hasan Hagverdiyev
Brother of Ali Hagverdiyev, Huseyn Hagverdiyev, Zemfira Gafarova
Husband of Yelena Hagverdiyeva

References

1960 births
2004 deaths
Soviet people
Azerbaijani painters